William Ashby may refer to:
William Ashby (cricketer) (1786–1847), English cricketer
W. Ross Ashby (1903–1972), English psychiatrist and cyberneticist
William Ashby (died 1543), MP for Leicestershire
William Ashby (died 1593), MP for Chichester and Grantham, and ambassador in Scotland
William Ashby, character in The Witch of Blackbird Pond
Bill Ashby, coach at Maine Sting
William Joseph Ashby (1885–1953), Irish rugby union player